James Lyng High School is a high school located in Montreal, Quebec, Canada.

It is currently operated by the English Montreal School Board. Before 1998 it was operated by the Montreal Catholic School Commission.

Public Enemy played a concert at the school on November 19, 1988.

References

External links

James Lyng High School

High schools in Montreal
English-language schools in Quebec
English Montreal School Board
Le Sud-Ouest